The Illusion of Progress is the sixth studio album by American rock band Staind. It was released on August 19, 2008. The Illusion of Progress was produced by Johnny K and recorded in lead singer Aaron Lewis's home studio. It debuted at No. 3 in the Billboard 200 with 91,800 units sold.

The lead single "Believe" topped the Alternative Songs chart on September 13, 2008. It accumulated three weeks at number one. The second single was "All I Want", and was released on November 24. The video continued the story of the first single video and was available on Staind's Myspace on December 12. In Europe the second single was "The Way I Am", and its video was available on the official Staind website as of December 24. "This Is It" was later released as the last single off the album. The album has sold over 318,000 units in the United States alone.

Lewis recorded a country version of the album’s ninth track "Tangled Up in You" on his 2011 solo EP Town Line.

Sound
Lewis commented, "We went into the studio with the mindset of making our heaviest record yet, but the record that came out has flavors of Pink Floyd and straight-up blues. We didn't use the same rigs that we use onstage; we used all vintage guitars and amps, and I'm pretty psyched about it.  The songs are pretty timeless in their texture." The band calls the new project the "most musical CD" they've recorded to date.

Promotion
To promote the album, Staind treated their fans to a series of intimate, behind-the-scenes "webisodes" posted on staind.com, documenting their recording process. Staind also premiered the song "Believe" worldwide on U.S. station KYSR in Los Angeles. Staind also released the song, "This Is It", on iTunes early as a single. "This Is It" was released as a downloadable track for the video game Rock Band on July 29 for the Xbox 360 and July 31 for PlayStation 3. "This Is It" was also featured on the soundtrack for the 2009 film Transformers: Revenge of the Fallen.

Reception
Initial critical response ranged from mixed to average. At Metacritic, which assigns a normalized rating out of 100 to reviews from mainstream critics, the album has received an average score of 53, based on 8 reviews.

Track listing
All lyrics written by Aaron Lewis; all music written and composed by Staind.

 Note: All other editions with bonus tracks only contain "It's Been A While (Acoustic At The Hiro Ballroom)" and "Schizophrenic Conversations (Acoustic At The Hiro Ballroom)".

 Note: The Japanese edition of The Illusion of Progress lists the two bonus tracks "Something Like Me" and "The Truth" as both recorded live at the Hiro Ballroom. This is incorrect. They are actually the studio versions recorded during the Chapter V album sessions.

 Note: "Something Like Me" offered as an iTunes exclusive pre-order.

Personnel
Credits taken from album’s liner notes.

Staind
 Aaron Lewis – lead vocals, rhythm guitar
 Mike Mushok – lead guitar
 Johnny April – bass, backing vocals
 Jon Wysocki – drums

Additional musicians
 John Pirruccello – pedal steel guitar 
 Johnny K – piano , Hammond organ 
 Rick Barnes – slide guitar 
 Stevie Blacke – orchestration 
 Vernard Burton, Emoni Wilkins, Sharlisa Brooks, Zita Smith, Lajuanese Robertson, and Carya Holmes-Brown – additional vocals

Production
 Johnny K – producer and engineer
 Tony "Tadpole" Mysliwiec – digital editing
 Justin Wilk – additional editing
 Jeff Gilmer – assistant engineer
 Ryan Williams – mixing
 Ted Jensen – mastering

Charts

Weekly charts

Year-end charts

References

External links
 Staind's Aaron Lewis Tells Fans To Expect Surprises On New LP, The Illusion Of Progress
 Lyrics

2008 albums
Staind albums
Flip Records (1994) albums